Southern Wu may refer to

Southern branch of Wu Chinese languages
Yang Wu, a state in China